The AAA Reina de Reinas Championship (literally "AAA Queen of Queens Championship", "AAA Women's Championship") is a singles women's professional wrestling championship promoted by Lucha Libre AAA Worldwide (AAA). It is the only females championship currently in AAA. Being a professional wrestling championship, it is not won legitimately; it is instead won via a scripted ending to a match or awarded to a wrestler because of a storyline. 

From its creation in 1999 to 2009, the title was put on the line every year during the eponymous "Reina de Reinas" tournament, in addition to traditional defenses. The tournament eventually returned in 2012, with Sexy Star becoming the first wrestler to successfully retain the title at the event.

The inaugural champion was Xóchitl Hamada, who was crowned after winning the original Reina de Reinas tournament in 1999. Faby Apache and Taya hold the record for most reigns with four, while they along with Tiffany and Sexy Star have the record for most Reina de Reinas tournaments won, with three. The record for longest reign is held by Taya, whose first reign lasted 945 days, with the record for shortest held by Ayako Hamada (Xóchitl's sister) at 33 days. Although the title is supposedly for women only, Pimpinela Escarlata, a luchador Exótico, won it in 2011.

Title history

Combined reigns

See also 
World Women's Championship (disambiguation)

References

External links
 AAA's official title history

Lucha Libre AAA Worldwide championships
Women's professional wrestling championships